Battle of the Cumberland Gap may refer to:

 Battle of the Cumberland Gap (1862)
 Battle of the Cumberland Gap (1863)